Alessandro "Dado", Principe Ruspoli (9 December 1924 – 11 January 2005) was an occasional actor and a playboy and eccentric aristocrat, the 9th Principe di Cerveteri, 9th Marchese di Riano, 14th Conte di Vignanello and Prince of the Roman Papal States. Dado descends from a brother of Cardinal Bartolomeo Ruspoli.

Dado was born in Rome in 1924. His mother, his father's first wife Claudia dei Conti Matarazzo, who died when he was 9, was heiress to one of the largest fortunes in Brazil. His father Francesco Ruspoli, 8th Prince of Cerveteri, later a poet, fought in both World Wars. Dado became known for his extravagant lifestyle in the 1950s and 60s. He was friends with Brigitte Bardot, Salvador Dalí, Truman Capote, Roger Vadim, Roman Polanski, Emmanuelle Arsan and many others.

Marriages and children

His first marriage, in Rome on 8 December 1947, was to Nobile Francesca dei Baroni Blanc (Rome, 27 June 1920 – Milan, 27 February 1962), daughter of Nobile Mario dei Baroni Blanc and wife Anita Felici. They had no children.

His second marriage at Vignanello, the location of the ancestral residence, Castello Ruspoli, on 5 May 1964, was to French aristocrat Nancy de Girard de Charbonnières (Pouillon, 18 April 1939 –), daughter of Roger Jean de Girard de Charbonnières and wife Andrée Marie Pommarède. The marriage produced one son: 
 Francesco Ruspoli, 10th Prince of Cerveteri

His third marriage was also in Rome, on 20 November 1993, to Theresa Patricia Genest. This marriage produced a daughter and a son: 
 Donna (Mathilde) Mélusine dei Principi Ruspoli (Paris, 25 July 1994), a socialite and friend of Lady Kitty Spencer 
 Don Théodore Alexandre dei Principi Ruspoli (Paris, 30 April 1997)

Between marriages he had two sons by actress Debra Berger (17 March 1957 –), daughter of William Berger:
 Tao Ruspoli, (7 November 1975), married actress Olivia Wilde (New York City, New York, 10 March 1984), without issue.
 Bartolomeo Ruspoli, (Rome, 6 October 1978 –), married in November 2004 Aileen Getty (14 July 1957), daughter of John Paul Getty, Jr. and first wife Abigail "Gail" Harris, without issue.

Filmography
 Identification of a Woman (1982) - Mavi's father
 Les italiens (1989) - un inquisitore
 The Godfather Part III (1990) - Vanni
 Faccione (1991)
 La casa del sorriso aka The House of Smiles (1991) - Andrea
 Il giardino dei ciliegi aka The Cherry Orchard (1992)
 The Young Indiana Jones Chronicles (1 episode, "Florence, May 1908", 1993) - Professor Reale
 Just Say Know (2002) - Himself
 The Adventures of Young Indiana Jones: The Perils of Cupid (2007) (V) - Professor Reale
 Marco Ferreri, il regista che venne dal futuro (2007) - Himself

Ancestry

See also
Tao Ruspoli
Ruspoli

References

External links

Alessandro Ruspoli on a genealogical site
Daily Telegraph obituary 

1924 births
2005 deaths
Alessandro
Alessandro
Italian male film actors
Italian socialites